Towers Perrin was a professional services firm specializing in human resources and financial services consulting, which merged in January 2010 with Watson Wyatt to form Towers Watson. The firm was a provider of reinsurance intermediary services and was active in the actuarial consulting arena with its Tillinghast insurance consulting practice.

History 
On March 1, 1934, Towers, Perrin, Forster & Crosby opened for business in Philadelphia, Pennsylvania. In 1987, Towers Perrin was established as the umbrella name for the firm. On June 28, 2009, Towers, Perrin, Forster & Crosby and Watson Wyatt Worldwide (NYSE:WW) announced their agreement to merge into a new publicly traded company called Towers Watson & Co. The merger was completed in January 2010.

Offices 
Towers Perrin had offices and alliance partners in the United States, Canada, Europe, Asia, Latin America, South Africa, Australia and New Zealand.

References 

Financial services companies of the United States
Business services companies established in 1934
Actuarial firms
1934 establishments in Pennsylvania
Companies disestablished in 2010
2010 disestablishments in Connecticut